The Taft Budge Bungalow, also known as the Taft Budge House, at 86 Center St. in Paris, Idaho, is a historic house that is listed on the National Register of Historic Places. The house is a Colonial Revival style bungalow which features enclosed eaves, a half-porch characteristic of local bungalows, and a gablet roof over the porch. The front facade of the house is horizontally oriented, a unique style for Paris bungalows.

It is one of four residences in Paris associated with the Budge family that is listed on the National Register. The Budge family played a prominent role in the city's Mormon stake, and member Alfred Budge served on the Idaho Supreme Court.

See also 

Budge Cottage, also NRHP-listed in Paris
Alfred Budge House, also NRHP-listed in Paris
Julia Budge House, also NRHP-listed in Paris

References 

Houses in Bear Lake County, Idaho
Colonial Revival architecture in Idaho
Houses on the National Register of Historic Places in Idaho
National Register of Historic Places in Bear Lake County, Idaho